William Shiel Smith (22 October 1903 – ?) was an English professional football wing half who played in the Football League for Burnley, Crystal Palace and Sheffield Wednesday.

Career statistics

References

1903 births
Year of death missing
Footballers from South Shields
English footballers
Association football wing halves
Sheffield Wednesday F.C. players
Crystal Palace F.C. players
Brentford F.C. players
Burnley F.C. players
English Football League players
Accrington Stanley F.C. (1891) players